Left shift may refer to:

Left shift (medicine), a medical term similar to blood shift
Logical left shift, a computer operation
Arithmetic left shift, a computer operation
Left Shift key, a key on a computer keyboard
Left Shift (political group) (aka Linksruck), a former Trotskyist group in Germany
Left shift (quality assurance), thinking about quality earlier in the product development lifecycle

See also 
 Right shift (disambiguation)